Edward Lisle Goldsworthy Hoad (January 29, 1896 – March 5, 1986) was a West Indian cricketer who played in West Indies' inaugural Test tour of England. He was the captain in the West Indies' first home Test in 1930. In all he played four Tests.

Hoad was born in Richmond, Saint Michael, Barbados. Although he had modest Test performances, he had some impressive results in first-class matches against English sides in both the 1928 and 1929-30 tours, scoring 149 not out against Worcestershire in 1928 and 147 for Barbados in 1930.

He died in Bridgetown, Barbados at the age of ninety. His son also played for Barbados.

References

External links

1896 births
1986 deaths
West Indies Test cricketers
Barbadian cricketers
Barbados cricketers
West Indies Test cricket captains